Nicolette is the debut album by Nicolette Larson, released in 1978 by Warner Bros. Records. It reached #15 on the US pop charts and #1 in Canada and was certified Gold in both markets.

Larson came to public attention singing backup for Neil Young on American Stars 'n Bars and Comes a Time. Her first charting single was Young's smoky composition "Lotta Love".  As a single, it hit #1 on Billboard's Adult Contemporary chart, #8 on the Billboard Hot 100, #8 on the Cash Box Top 100, and #8 in Record World magazine.  The follow-up single, "Rhumba Girl," fell short of the US Top 40, but reached #15 in Canada and #4 on the Canadian Adult Contemporary chart.

Eddie Van Halen appears uncredited on guitar on "Can't Get Away From You".

The album was re-released on CD in 2005 on the Wounded Bird label.

Album cover photo
The cover photo of the album was taken in the Garden Court restaurant at The Palace Hotel, San Francisco.

Track listing

Personnel
Nicolette Larson – vocals, backing vocals, guitar, percussion
Paul Barrère – guitar
James Burton – guitar, dobro
Valerie Carter – backing vocals
Victor Feldman – vibes, percussion
Michael McDonald – backing vocals
Bill Payne – keyboards
Herb Pedersen – guitar, backing vocals
Linda Ronstadt – backing vocals
Bob Glaub – bass guitar
Mark T. Jordan – keyboards
David Kalish – guitar
Bobby LaKind – percussion, conga, triangle
Albert Lee – guitar, mandolin
Fred Tackett – guitar
Ted Templeman – percussion, backing vocals
Klaus Voormann – bass guitar
Sid Sharp – synthesizer, concertmaster
Jimmie Haskell – strings, accordion, conductor, string arrangements, woodwind arrangement
Chuck Findley – horn
Jim Horn – horn
Plas Johnson – flute
Andrew Love – saxophone
Steve Madaio – horn
Rick Shlosser – drums
Patrick Simmons – guitar
Edward Van Halen - guitar on "Can't Get Away from You"

Additional personnel
Donn Landee – engineer
Mike Zagaris – photography
Joel Bernstein – sleeve photo
Dave Bhang – art direction, design

Charts

Certifications and sales

References

Nicolette Larson albums
1978 debut albums
Albums arranged by Jimmie Haskell
Albums produced by Ted Templeman
Warner Records albums